Bollygum may refer to a number of tree species:

Beilschmiedia obtusifolia, hard bollygum
Blepharocarya depauperata, North Queensland bollygum, northern bollygum
Blepharocarya involucrigera, North Queensland bollygum, northern bollygum
Dysoxylum schiffneri, hard bollygum
Litsea breviumbellata, brown bollygum, soft bollygum
Litsea fawcettiana, bollygum
Litsea glutinosa, brown bollygum, soft bollygum
Litsea leefeana, brown bollywood, soft bollygum, big-leaf bollywood
Litsea reticulata,	brown bollygum, soft bollygum
Neolitsea australiensis, green bollygum
Neolitsea cassia, smooth barbed bollygum
Neolitsea dealbata, hairy-leaf bollygum, white bollygum

See also
Bollywood (tree)

References